Robert Byron may refer to:

 Robert Byron (Royalist) (d. 1674), Anglo-Irish soldier, member of parliament for Ardee in the Irish House of Commons
 Robert Byron (1905–1941), British travel writer, art critic, and historian, best known for his travelogue The Road to Oxiana
 Robert Byron (cricketer) (1910–1952), South African cricketer
 Red Byron, Robert "Red" Byron, (1915–1960), NASCAR driver
 Robert Byron, 13th Baron Byron (1950–), British peer and barrister
Bob Byron, see 1995 Ontario general election

See also